Jérémy Sopalski (born 6 February 1981 in Somain, France) is a French football player of Polish descent.

Career
2000–2002 : AJ Auxerre
2002–2003 : FC Istres
2003–2004 : FC Rouen
2004–2006 : Associação Naval 1º de Maio
2006–2009 : Rodez AF
2009–2012 : Tours FC

Statistics
18 matches in Ligue 2
23 matches in Championnat National
77 matches in CFA
4 matches in Liga de Honra

References

1982 births
Living people
French footballers
French people of Polish descent
Association football goalkeepers
AJ Auxerre players
FC Istres players
FC Rouen players
Tours FC players
Ligue 2 players